Adolfo Julián Gaich (born 26 February 1999) is an Argentine professional footballer who plays as a centre-forward for Italian  club Hellas Verona on loan from the Russian club CSKA Moscow, and the Argentina national team.

Club career

San Lorenzo
Gaich had youth spells with Unión Bengolea, Sportivo Chazón, Atenas and Atlético Pascanas before joining San Lorenzo in 2014. Four years later, Gaich was promoted into their first-team under Claudio Biaggio, making his professional debut on 27 August 2018 during a draw with Unión Santa Fe; he had previously been an unused substitute in an Argentine Primera División fixture with Lanús and for a Copa Sudamericana game against Nacional. Gaich scored his first senior goal in the following September, netting the opener in a 3–2 win over Patronato; which preceded another two appearances later in the Copa Argentina versus Estudiantes.

CSKA Moscow
On 17 July 2020, Gaich said goodbye to San Lorenzo supporters via Fox Sports' 90 Minutos de Fútbol ahead of a potential move to Russian football with CSKA Moscow. On 30 July 2020, San Lorenzo confirmed the transfer. On 5 August 2020, CSKA announced the signing of a 5-year contract. He made his league debut off the bench against Khimki on 8 August, before starting for the first time in a defeat to Zenit Saint Petersburg on 19 August. Gaich's first goal arrived on 22 October in a UEFA Europa League group stage draw away in Austria against Wolfsberger AC.

Loan to Benevento
On 29 January 2021, Gaich moved to Serie A club Benevento on loan. The deal includes an option to buy. After sub appearances against Napoli and Hellas Verona, the centre-forward made his first start and scored his first goal in an away match versus Spezia on 6 March. He netted again on 21 March to secure a 1–0 away victory over Juventus.

Loan to Huesca
On 30 August 2021, Gaich switched teams and countries again after agreeing to a one-year loan deal with SD Huesca in the Spanish Segunda División. He returned to CSKA for the 2022–23 season.

Loan to Hellas Verona
On 31 January 2023, Hellas Verona welcomed Adolfo Gaich to the team, the Argentinian striker signed a temporary contract until 30 June 2023 on loan from CSKA Moscow. Before going on loan, Gaich extended his contract with CSKA Moscow until the end of 2025.

International career
In 2018, Gaich was selected by the Argentina U20s for the L'Alcúdia International Tournament in Spain. He scored three goals, one in Argentina's group opener with Venezuela and two on the next matchday against Murcia, in five appearances as his nation won the trophy. In December, Gaich was picked for the 2019 South American U-20 Championship. Another U20 call-up came in May 2019 as Fernando Batista called him up to his 2019 FIFA U-20 World Cup squad. He subsequently scored goals in Poland against South Africa, Portugal and Mali. In the following months, Gaich made the U23s' squad for the 2019 Pan American Games.

At the Pan American Games in Peru, Gaich netted twice on his debut in a 2–3 win over Ecuador; also assisting the other goal. Further goals occurred versus Mexico and Panama, which preceded two in the semi-finals against Uruguay. Argentina won the final against Honduras, which gave Gaich a goal medal. Gaich was, soon after, selected by Lionel Scaloni's seniors for September friendlies with Chile and Mexico. He made his full international bow, aged twenty, in a 4–0 victory over Mexico at the Alamodome on 10 September, having remained on the bench against Chile days prior.

Personal life
Born in Argentina, Gaich is of German descent.

Career statistics

Club
.

International
.

Honours
Argentina U20
 L'Alcúdia International Football Tournament: 2018

Argentina U23
 Pan American Games: 2019
 Pre-Olympic Tournament: 2020

References

External links
 
 Adolfo Julian Gaich at the 2019 Pan American Games
 
 

1999 births
Living people
Sportspeople from Córdoba Province, Argentina
Argentine footballers
Argentina international footballers
Argentina youth international footballers
Argentina under-20 international footballers
Argentine people of German descent
Footballers at the 2019 Pan American Games
Pan American Games gold medalists for Argentina
Pan American Games medalists in football
Association football forwards
Argentine expatriate footballers
Expatriate footballers in Russia
Expatriate footballers in Italy
Expatriate footballers in Spain
Argentine expatriate sportspeople in Russia
Argentine expatriate sportspeople in Italy
Argentine expatriate sportspeople in Spain
Argentine Primera División players
Russian Premier League players
Serie A players
San Lorenzo de Almagro footballers
PFC CSKA Moscow players
Benevento Calcio players
SD Huesca footballers
Hellas Verona F.C. players
Medalists at the 2019 Pan American Games
Olympic footballers of Argentina
Footballers at the 2020 Summer Olympics